Ralph Barlow (1876 – 1897) was an English footballer who played for Burslem Port Vale in the mid-1890s.

Career
Barlow joined Burslem Port Vale in January 1895, making his debut in a 2–0 win at Rotherham Town on 7 September 1895. He played 29 Second Division games in the 1895–96 season, and scored his first goal in the Football League in a 2–1 win over Crewe Alexandra at the Athletic Ground on 26 October. However he suffered a breakdown in September 1896 and was sent to a convalescent home. His recovery was a slow one, and so the club arranged a benefit match for him in April 1897 and released him from his contract at the end of the 1896–97 season.

Career statistics
Source:

References

1876 births
1897 deaths
Footballers from Staffordshire
English footballers
Association football midfielders
Port Vale F.C. players
English Football League players